PixelJAM Games is an American independent video game studio run by Richard Grillotti (b. 1972), Miles Tilmann and A.D. Bakke, known for their pixellated Flash games that "toy with traditional genres, but have quirky ideas and touches." Their most notable games include Dino Run, Gamma Bros, and Potatoman Seeks the Troof.

History
The name "PixelJam" comes from an "abstract pixel animation art experiment/site" that Richard Grilloti was playing around with in the late 1990s. Around 2004, he and his friend from college, Miles Tilmann, made their first game, also collaborating with 8bit musician Mark Denardo. Grilloti and Tilman were originally both based in Chicago, then the studio went virtual for a couple of years when Grilloti lived in Oregon, but both Grilloti and Tilman later moved to Asheville, North Carolina. The studio has made many games for Adult Swim. In 2015, the studio had 5 employees.

In 2007, PixelJAM developed a Flash shoot 'em up game, called Gamma Bros. It was nominated for "Best Web Browser Game" at the Independent Games Festival. The player takes control of brothers Buzz and Zap Gamma who are on their way home from a galactic commute and must survive hoards of oncoming enemies.

Games
Cookie Party 2
Corporate Climber 
Cream Wolf - 
Dino Run
Dino Run DX
Dino Run: Marathon of Doom
Dino Run: Enter Planet D
Dino Run SE
Gamma Bros
Glorkian Warrior: The Trials of Glork 
Hipster Kickball
Last Horizon
Mountain Maniac 
Mountain Maniac Xmas 
Pizza City! 
Potatoman Seeks the Troof
Ratmaze 
Ratmaze 2
Ratmaze Nightmare 
Sausage Factory 
Snowball 
Turbo Granny

References

Video game companies of the United States
Indie video game developers